Alder Branch is an unincorporated community in Sevier County, Tennessee, United States.  It is accessible via State Route 338, outside of the city of Sevierville. The area is named for the Alder Branch Baptist Church founded in 1836, which itself is named for the Alder Branch stream which flows through the area.

William Atchley, a locally famous Baptist preacher and member of the church, deeded a portion of his property to the Alder Branch Baptist Church and Cemetery where he now lies in state.

Geography

References

Unincorporated communities in Sevier County, Tennessee
Unincorporated communities in Tennessee